Gregory Steven Moore (born July 6, 1977 in Long Beach, California) is an American college baseball coach and former catcher and pitcher. Moore is the head baseball coach at Saint Mary's College of California. Moore played college baseball at Long Beach City College and the University of San Francisco. He served as head coach of the Cal State Northridge Matadors baseball team from 2014 to 2019.

Moore was a pitcher and catcher, first for Long Beach City College then San Francisco.  Following his playing career, he became an assistant for the Dons and served as recruiting coordinator.  He served one year as a pitching coach at Washington before returning to San Francisco as associate head coach.  He earned his first head coaching job at Cal State Northridge prior to the 2014 season. With a 161–175 record in six seasons, Moore was fired from his head coaching position at Cal State Northridge.

On June 15, 2019, Moore was hired as the head coach of the Saint Mary's.

Head coaching record
The following is a table of Moore's yearly records as an NCAA head coach.

References

1977 births
Living people
Cal State Northridge Matadors baseball coaches
Long Beach City Vikings baseball players
San Francisco Dons baseball coaches
San Francisco Dons baseball players
Washington Huskies baseball coaches
Sportspeople from Long Beach, California
Saint Mary's Gaels baseball coaches
Baseball players from Long Beach, California